John Wakefield Willink (24 October 1858 – 22 September 1927) was an Anglican dean in the first half of the 20th century.

Willink was educated at Clifton College and Pembroke College, Cambridge. Ordained in 1881, he held a curacy at Bishop Auckland before becoming Vicar of St John's, Sunderland. In 1891 he moved to St Helens and then held further incumbencies at Great Yarmouth  and St Martin in the Bull Ring, Birmingham. He became Dean of Norwich in 1919 and held the post until his death on 22 September 1927.

Notes

1858 births
People educated at Clifton College
Alumni of Pembroke College, Cambridge
Deans of Norwich
1927 deaths